Ciliopagurus substriatiformis was a species of hermit crab that existed during the Badenian stage (Middle Miocene).

References

Hermit crabs
Fossil taxa described in 1929